James Wansacz (born June 8, 1972) is an American politician and member of the Democratic Party. He was a member of the Pennsylvania House of Representatives from 2000 through 2010. He was first elected in a special election held on June 20, 2000 and served until his retirement in 2010 after an unsuccessful run for the State Senate. In 2011, Wansacz was elected to serve on the Lackawanna County Board of Commissioners.  In the 2015 Democratic primary, he was defeated for renomination by former Democratic chairman Jerry Notarianni and Republican-turned-Democrat Patrick O'Malley.

References

External links

Living people
Democratic Party members of the Pennsylvania House of Representatives
1972 births
Politicians from Scranton, Pennsylvania
Indiana University of Pennsylvania alumni

Lackawanna County Commissioners (Pennsylvania)